...De Piel Negra is a greatest hits album by Mexican rock singer Alejandra Guzmán. It was released in 1994. The album has seven songs that had been released previously, and three new songs.

Track listing

References

1994 greatest hits albums
Alejandra Guzmán compilation albums
Fonovisa Records compilation albums
Spanish-language compilation albums